Camp Massad of Canada may refer to:
 Camp Massad (Manitoba), a Jewish summer camp at Winnipeg Beach, Manitoba
 Camp Massad (Montreal), a Jewish summer camp in Ste. Agathe, Quebec, based in Montreal

Massad